Darzab is the southwesternmost district in Jowzjan province, Afghanistan. It borders Sheberghan District to northeast, Sar-e Pol Province to the west and Faryab Province to the south and west. The population is 52,800 (2012). The district center is Darzab.

References

District Map 
 Map of Settlements AIMS, August 2002

Districts of Jowzjan Province